Helping Hands is a 1941 Our Gang short comedy film directed by Edward Cahn. It was the 201st Our Gang short released (202nd episode, 113th talking short, 114th talking episode, and 33rd MGM-produced episode).

Plot
Spanky receives a letter from his recently drafted older brother. Inspired by the letter's patriotic sentiments, Spanky and the gang organize a "home guard," prepared to do battle should the Nazis invade California. This attracts the attention of Army Major Sanford, who informs the kids that they would be of even greater service to Uncle Sam by looking out for fire hazards, collecting scrap metal and paper, and encouraging their parents to buy war stamps and bonds.

Cast

The Gang
 Mickey Gubitosi as Mickey
 Darla Hood as Darla
 Billy Laughlin as Froggy
 George McFarland as Spanky
 Billie Thomas as Buckwheat

Additional cast
 Vincent Graeff as Sentree
 James Gubitosi as Nick
 Edward Soo Hoo as Lee Wong
 Harvard Peck as Boy examined by Froggy
 Leon Tyler as Swedish boy
 Freddie Chapman as Kid complaining in line
 Mickey Laughlin as Kid hit with baseball bat
 Margaret Bert as Mickey's mother
 Sam Flint as Major Sanford
 Byron Foulger as Mr. Morton, head of civilian counsel
 Joe Young as Clerk
 Raphael Dolciame as Kid
 Ralph Hodges as Kid
 Mickey McGuire as Kid
 Michael Miller as Kid
 Tommy Dee Miller as Kid
 Emmet Vogan as Darla's father (scene deleted)

Note
The film marked the first of the wartime propaganda-themed shorts in the Our Gang series. Critics and fans both have cited that the wartime films marked a noticeable decline in the series.

See also
 Our Gang filmography

References

External links

1941 films
American black-and-white films
Films directed by Edward L. Cahn
Metro-Goldwyn-Mayer short films
1941 comedy films
Our Gang films
1941 short films
1940s American films